Mount Whiteface is a  mountain located in Grafton County, New Hampshire. The mountain is part of the Sandwich Range of the White Mountains.  Whiteface is flanked to the northwest by Mount Tripyramid, and to the northeast by Mount Passaconaway. Whiteface is on the eastern border of the Sandwich Range Wilderness. To the east, between Whiteface, Passaconaway, and Mt. Wonalancet, lies The Bowl natural area, an unlogged cirque.

Mt. Whiteface lies within the watershed of the Saco River, which reaches the Gulf of Maine at Saco, Maine. The south side of Whiteface is drained by the Whiteface River, thence into the Cold River, Bearcamp River,  Ossipee River, and the Saco River. The east side is drained by the Wonalancet River, thence into Swift River, and Bearcamp River. The north side is drained by Downes Brook, thence into another Swift River, and the Saco River.

Many hikers reach the open area at the top of the cliff and do not realize the true summit is farther to the north.

The summit is popular among winter climbers, favoring the Blueberry Ledge trail for ascent.

History 
In the 1850s, the first official trail to the summit is built, the McCrillis trail.

In 1871, the US Coast Survey erected a signal station on the summit.

In 1875, the poet Lucy Larcom visited the summit, and wrote a sonnet about it.

In 1895, Thomas S. Wiggin cuts the Wiggin trail to the summit, branching from Dicey's Mill Trail.

In 1899, Gordon H. Taylor blazes the Blueberry Ledge Trail, useful for snowshoeing.

In 1914, The Bowl is added to the WMNF.

In 1931, The bowl is designated as a Research Natural Area.

In 1984, Congress creates the Sandwich Range Wilderness, including Mount Whiteface.

In 2002, Camp Shehadi and Camp Heermance are removed due to deterioration.

See also

 List of mountains in New Hampshire
 White Mountain National Forest

References

External links
  PeakBagger.com: Mt. Whiteface
 AMC: Mt. Whiteface
  hikethewhites.com: Mt. Whiteface
  Mt. Whiteface - FranklinSites.com Hiking Guide

Mountains of New Hampshire
Mountains of Grafton County, New Hampshire
New England Four-thousand footers